Graciano Antuña (1903, El Entrego, Asturias – May 13, 1937) was a Spanish union socialist politician.

He participated in the direction of the Alianza Obera committee during the 1934 revolution in Asturias. He was President of the Asturian Socialist Federation of the Spanish Socialist Workers' Party and Secretary General of the Sindicato de Obreros Mineros de Asturias. The failure of the 1934 revolt forced to him to exile to France. In 1936, however he was delegated to the Congress of Deputies

During the Spanish Civil War in 1936 he was caught in Oviedo on 20 July, and killed the following May.

References
VV.AA. La Guerra Civil en Asturias. Edit. La Nueva España y Cajastur, 2006.

1903 births
1937 deaths
People from San Martín del Rey Aurelio
Spanish Socialist Workers' Party politicians
Assassinated Spanish politicians
Politicians killed in the Spanish Civil War
People murdered in Spain
Spanish people who died in prison custody
Prisoners who died in Spanish detention
Members of the Congress of Deputies of the Second Spanish Republic